This is the discography of American singer-songwriter Neil Diamond. He has sold more than 130 million records worldwide, making him one of the best-selling music artists in history. Billboard ranked him as the 25th greatest artist of all time. According to the Recording Industry Association of America (RIAA), Diamond has sold 49.5 million albums in the United States.

Diamond is the only artist to score a top 20 hit in each decade since the creation of Billboards Adult Contemporary chart. In a career spanning five decades, he has scored 38 top-40 singles and 16 top-10 albums on Billboard charts.

Studio albums

1960s

1970s

1980s

1990s

2000–present

Soundtrack albums

Live albums

Compilation albums

There have been over 150 official and unofficial compilation albums released across the world for Neil Diamond.

Below is a selected discography of compilation albums with chart history.

1960s–1980s

1990–present

Singles

1960s

1970s

1980s

1990s

2000–present

Notes

References

External links

Pop music discographies
Discographies of American artists
Rock music discographies
Discography